Fudbalski klub Željezničar Sarajevo is a professional football club based in Sarajevo, Bosnia and Herzegovina. This chronological list comprises all those who have held the position of manager of the first team of Željezničar from 1922, when the first professional manager was appointed, to the present day.  Each manager's entry includes his dates of tenure, major honours won and significant achievements under his leadership. Caretaker managers are included, where known. As of the 2022–23 season, Željezničar has had 63 managers.

The first manager of Željezničar was Adolf Šmit. He managed the club for one season. Josip Šebalj is the club's longest-serving manager, managing Željezničar for 11 years.

The most successful Željezničar manager in terms of trophies won is Amar Osim, who won five Bosnian Premier League titles, four Bosnian Cups and one Bosnian Supercup. Milan Ribar, Amar Osim and his father, Ivica Osim, are the three managers with the most managerial appearances for Željezničar.

List of managers
The complete list of Željezničar managers is shown in the following table:

Information correct as of  2023.

Honours

Notes
A.  The club's first manager.

B.  Longest-serving manager in club history.

C.  Caretaker manager.

D.  Most honours.

References

External links
History at themaniacs.org

Manager
Zeljeznicar
FK Zelj
FK Zelj
Lists of Bosnia and Herzegovina sportspeople